The Virgin of the Angels is a painting by Pere Serra conserved at the National Art Museum of Catalonia.

Description
This central panel and  the two sections of the predella with saints (which must once have flanked a tabernacle) are all that remains of an altarpiece. It was dedicated to the Virgin Mary and was painted for one of the chapels in the ambulatory of Tortosa cathedral, probably towards the 1380s. The compartment with the Virgin and Child surrounded by angels playing music is a very graceful and refined version of an iconographic type that was extremely popular at the time. Pere Serra, author of the altarpiece, came from a family of painters who grew to head the Catalan painting of the second half of the fourteenth century.

References

External links
 The artwork at Museum's website

1380s paintings
Catalan paintings
Paintings in the collection of the Museu Nacional d'Art de Catalunya
Paintings of the Madonna and Child
Angels in art
Musical instruments in art
Altarpieces